Bulkeley Hall is a country house to the southwest of the village of Bulkeley, Cheshire, England.  It dates from the middle of the 18th century, and was built for Thomas Bulkeley.  The house is constructed in brick with a slate roof.  Its architectural style is Georgian.  The  entrance front has three storeys, and is in seven bays.  A service wing at right-angles gives it an L-shaped plan.  The interior contains 18th-century plasterwork and joinery.  The house is recorded in the National Heritage List for England as a designated Grade II* listed building.

See also

Grade II* listed buildings in Cheshire East
Listed buildings in Bulkeley

References

Further reading

Houses completed in the 18th century
Country houses in Cheshire
Georgian architecture in Cheshire
Grade II* listed buildings in Cheshire
Grade II* listed houses